Everett Ferguson (born February 18, 1933) currently serves as Distinguished Scholar in Residence at Abilene Christian University in Abilene, Texas. He is author of numerous books on early Christian studies and served as co-editor of the Journal of Early Christian Studies.

Early life and education

He received both his undergraduate bachelor's degree and his first master's degree from Abilene Christian University in the mid-1950s. He immediately proceeded to Harvard University and received his Bachelor of Sacred Theology followed by a doctoral degree "with distinction" in History and Philosophy of Religion.

Awards and honors

During his education, Ferguson received such honors as the Honorary John Harvard Fellowship and Harvard Graduate School Fellowship. He later received awards from the Christian Research Foundation for both his dissertation, "Ordination in the Ancient Church," and for a translation of Gregory of Nyssa's Life of Moses. He was selected to speak as the John G. Gammie Senior Lecturer of the Southwest Commission for Religious Studies. He was later presented with a festschrift, The Early Church in Its Context: Essays in Honor of Everett Ferguson.

Memberships

Dr. Ferguson was a council member of the Association Internationale D'Etudes Patristiques, which seeks "to promote the study of Christian antiquity, especially the Fathers of the Church, without prejudice to work undertaken in this domain in various countries." He served for a term on the council of the American Society of Church History, and has also previously served as president of the North American Patristics Society (1990-1992), from which he received the Distinguished Service Award for more than thirty years of service.

Bibliography
Monographs

 The Early Church at Work and Worship. Vol 3 (Eugene, OR: Wipf and Stock, 2017.) 
The Rule of Faith: A Guide. (Eugene, OR: Cascade Books, 2015.) 
Women in the Church: Biblical and Historical Perspective. (Abilene, TX: Desert Willow Publishing, 2015.) 
The Early Church at Work and Worship. Vol 2 (Eugene, OR: Wipf and Stock, 2014.) 
The Early Church and Today. Vol. 2 (Abilene, TX: Abilene Christian University Press, 2014.) 
A Cappella Music in the Public Worship of the Church. (Abilene, TX: Desert Willow Publishing, 2013.) 
Church History: From Christ to Pre-Reformation. 2nd ed.  (Grand Rapids: Zondervan, 2013.)  
The Early Church at Work and Worship. Vol 1 (Eugene, OR: Wipf and Stock, 2013.) 
The Early Church and Today. Vol. 1 (Abilene, TX: Abilene Christian University Press, 2011.) 
Thinking--Living--Dying: Early Apologists Speak to the 21st Century. (Vienna, WV: Warren Christian Apologetics Center, 2010.) 
Baptism in the Early Church: History, Theology, and Liturgy in the First Five Centuries. (Grand Rapids, MI: Eerdmans Publishing Co., 2009.) 
Church History: From Christ to Pre-Reformation. (Grand Rapids: Zondervan, 2005.) 
Inheriting Wisdom: Readings for Today from Ancient Christian Writers. (Peabody, MA: Hendrickson Publishers, 2004.) 
Women in the Church. (Chickasha, OK: Yeomen Press, 2003.)
Backgrounds of Early Christianity. (Grand Rapids, MI: Eerdmans Publishing Co., 1987; 3rd ed., 2003.) 
Early Christians Speak. Vol. 2 (Abilene, Texas: Abilene Christian University Press, 2002.) 
Early Christians Speak. Vol. 1, 3rd ed. (Abilene, Texas: Abilene Christian University Press, 1999.) 
Some Contemporary Issues Concerning Worship and the Christian Assembly. (Ohio Valley College, 1998).
The Church of Christ: A Biblical Ecclesiology for Today. (Grand Rapids, MI:  Eerdmans Publishing Co., 1996.) 
Church History, Early and Medieval. 2nd ed. (Abilene, Texas: Abilene Christian University Press, 1996.) 
Justin Martyr on Jews, Christians and the Covenant. (Franciscan Printing Press, 1993.)
The Everlasting Kingdom: The Kingdom of God in Scripture and in Our Lives. (Abilene, Texas: Abilene Christian University Press, 1989.)
A Cappella Music in the Public Worship of the Church. 2nd ed. (Abilene, Texas: Abilene Christian University Press, 1988). 
Backgrounds of Early Christianity. (Grand Rapids, MI: Eerdmans Publishing Co., 1987). 
Acts of the Apostles: The Message of the New Testament. 2 vols. (Abilene, Texas: Abilene Christian University Press, 1986.)
Demonology of the Early Christian World. (Em Text, 1984) 
The Message of the New Testament: The Letters of John. (Abilene, TX: Biblical Research Press.) 
The New Testament Church. (Abilene, Texas: Abilene Christian University Press, 1984.) 
Inscriptions and the Origin of Infant Baptism. (Oxford: Clarendon Press, 1979). 
Progress in Perfection: Gregory of Nyssa's Vita Moysis. (Berlin, Akademie-Verlag, 1976)
Church History: Reformation and Modern. (Abilene, Texas: Abilene Christian University Press, 1967.) 
Church History: Early and Medieval. (Abilene, Texas: Abilene Christian University Press, 1966.)

Edited Publications

Understandings of the Church, ed. (Minneapolis: Fortress Press, 2016.) 
Encyclopedia of Early Christianity, ed. (New York: Garland Publishing, 1990; 2nd ed.,1997. It later came out as an paperback in 1999 and it has been around ever since.) 
Recent Studies in Early Christianity, ed., 6 vols. (New York: Garland Publishing, 1999.)
Christianity and Society: The Social World of Early Christianity. (New York: Garland Publishing, 1999.)
Christianity in Relation to Jews, Greeks, and Romans. (New York: Garland Publishing, 1999.) 
Doctrinal Diversity: Varieties of Early Christianity. (New York: Garland Publishing, 1999.) 
Forms of Devotion: Conversion, Worship, Spirituality, and Asceticism. (New York: Garland Publishing, 1999.) 
History, Hope, Human Language, and Christian Reality. (New York: Garland Publishing, 1999.) 
Norms of Faith and Life. (New York: Garland Publishing, 1999.) 
Studies in Early Christianity, ed., 18 vols. (New York: Garland Publishing, 1993.)
Acts of Piety in the Early Church. (New York: Garland Publishing, 1993). 
The Bible in the Early Church. (New York: Garland Publishing, 1993.) 
Christian Life: Ethics, Morality, and Discipline in the Early Church. (New York: Garland Publishing, 1993.) 
Church and State in the Early Church. (New York: Garland Publishing, 1993.) 
Church, Ministry, and Organization in the Early Church Era. (New York: Garland Publishing, 1993.) 
Doctrines of God and Christ in the Early Church. (New  York: Garland Publishing, 1993.) 
Early Christianity and Judaism. (New  York: Garland Publishing, 1993.) 
Literature of the Early Church. (New  York: Garland Publishing, 1993.) 
Missions and Regional Characteristics of the Early Church. (New York: Garland Publishing, 1993.) 
Orthodoxy, Heresy, and Schism in Early Christianity. (New York: Garland Publishing, 1993.) 
Personalities of the Early Church. (New York: Garland Publishing, 1993.) 
Worship in Early Christianity. (New York: Garland Publishing, 1993.) 
Greeks Romans, and Christians: Essays in Honor of Abraham J. Malherbe. ed. with David L. Balch & Wayne A. Meeks. (Minneapolis: Fortress Press, 1990)
Christian Teaching: Studies in Honor of LeMoine G. Lewis, ed. (Abilene, TX: Abilene Christian University Press, 1981)

References

1933 births
Living people
American historians of religion
Abilene Christian University alumni
Harvard Divinity School alumni
Abilene Christian University faculty
American members of the Churches of Christ